Maurice Tougas (born February 19, 1956) is a Canadian politician, who formerly represented the electoral district of Edmonton Meadowlark in the Legislative Assembly of Alberta. He is a member of the Liberal Party.  He was first elected in the 2004 election, when he defeated incumbent Progressive Conservative Bob Maskell, but did not seek re-election at the conclusion of his term.

Before entering politics, Tougas wrote a weekly column for the Edmonton Examiner. He resigned from this position when he declared his candidacy in 2004, in order to avoid any conflicts of interest.  He was a columnist and editor for the Edmonton alternative weekly SEE magazine until the magazine ceased publication in 2011.

Tougas' 2004 campaign was distinguished by being one of the lowest budget successful campaigns in recent provincial election history, spending less than $5400.

References

External links
 Maurice Tougas' blog
 SEE Magazine column

1956 births
Alberta Liberal Party MLAs
Living people
Franco-Albertan people
Politicians from Edmonton
21st-century Canadian politicians